The phonology of Vietnamese features 19 consonant phonemes, with 5 additional consonant phonemes used in Vietnamese's Southern dialect, and 4 exclusive to the Northern dialect.  Vietnamese also has 14 vowel nuclei, and 6 tones that are integral to the interpretation of the language.  Older interpretations of Vietnamese tones differentiated between "sharp" and "heavy" entering and departing tones.  This article is a technical description of the sound system of the Vietnamese language, including phonetics and phonology. Two main varieties of Vietnamese, Hanoi and Ho Chi Minh City, which are slightly different to each other, are described below.

Initial consonants
Initial consonants which exist only in the Northern dialect are in red, while those that exist only in the Southern dialect are in blue.

 /w/ is the only initial consonant permitted to form consonant clusters with other consonants.
 The glottalized stops are preglottalized and voiced:   (the glottis is always closed before the oral closure). This glottal closure is often not released before the release of the oral closure, resulting in the characteristic implosive pronunciation. However, sometimes the glottal closure is released prior to the oral release in which case the stops are pronounced . Therefore, the primary characteristic is preglottalization with implosion being secondary.
  are bilabial, while  are labiodental.
  are denti-alveolar, while  are apico-alveolar.
  are phonetically lamino-palatoalveolar  (the blade of the tongue makes contact behind the alveolar ridge).
  are often slightly affricated , but they are unaspirated.
 A glottal stop  is inserted before words that begin with a vowel or :

{| cellpadding="5" style="line-height: 1.0em;"
| ăn
| 'to eat'
| 
| →
| 
|-
| uỷ
| 'to delegate'
| 
| →
| 
|}

Hanoi initials
 d, gi and r are all pronounced .
 ch and tr are both pronounced , while x and s are both pronounced . 
 Some rural speakers merge  and  into , although this is not considered standard.

Ho Chi Minh City initials
 d and gi are both pronounced .
 Historically,  is pronounced  in common speech, merging with d and gi. In loanwords, it is always pronounced : va li . 
 Historically, a distinction is made between ch  and tr , as well as between x  and s .
 In informal speech, and sometimes  are pronounced .
 In southern speech, the phoneme , generally represented in Vietnamese linguistics by the letter , has a number of variant pronunciations that depend on the speaker. More than one pronunciation may even be found within a single speaker. It may occur as a retroflex fricative , an alveolar approximant , a flap  or a trill , especially in loanwords.

Comparison of initials
The table below summarizes these sound correspondences:

{| class="wikitable" style="text-align: center;"
! rowspan="2" | Diaphoneme
! rowspan="2" | Hanoi
! rowspan="2" | Ho Chi Minh City
! colspan="3" | Example
|-
! word
! Hanoi
! Saigon
|-
! 
| 
|  or 
| style="text-align: left;" | vợ   'wife'
| 
|  or 
|-
! rowspan="2" | 
| rowspan="3" | 
| rowspan="2" | 
| style="text-align: left;" | da   'skin'
| rowspan="3" | 
| rowspan="2" | 
|-
| style="text-align: left;" | gia   'to add'
|-
! 
| 
| style="text-align: left;" | ra   'to go out'
| 
|-
! 
| rowspan="2" | 
| 
| style="text-align: left;" | chẻ   'split'
| rowspan="2" | 
| 
|-
! 
| or 
| style="text-align: left;" | trẻ   'young'
| or  
|-
! 
| rowspan="2" | 
| 
| style="text-align: left;" | xinh   'beautiful'
| rowspan="2" | 
| 
|-
! 
| or 
| style="text-align: left;" | sinh   'born'
| or 
|}

Vowels

Vowel nuclei

The IPA chart of vowel nuclei above is based on the sounds in Hanoi Vietnamese; other regions may have slightly different inventories. Vowel nuclei consist of monophthongs (simple vowels) and three centering diphthongs.

 All vowels are unrounded except for the four back rounded vowels: .
 In the South, the high vowels  are all diphthongized in open syllables: , Ba Vì .
These short vowels only occur in closed syllables.
For some speakers the distinction may be one of vowel quality or of the articulation of the syllable coda in addition to or instead of vowel quantity.
 : Many descriptions, such as Thompson, consider this vowel to be close back unrounded: . However, Han's instrumental analysis indicates that it is more central than back. ,  and  also transcribe this vowel as central.

Closing sequences
Below is a chart listing the closing sequences of general northern speech.

{| class="wikitable nowrap" style="text-align: center;"
! rowspan="2" |
! colspan="2" |  offglide
! colspan="2" |  offglide
|-
! Front
! colspan="2" | Central
! Back
|-
! Centering
|  
|  
|  
|  
|-
! Close
|  
|  
|  
|  
|-
! Close-mid/Mid
|  
| –
 
|  
 
|  
|-
! Open-mid/Open
|  
|  
 
|  
 
|  
|}

Finals
When stops  occur at the end of words, they have no audible release:

{| cellpadding="5" style="line-height: 1.0em;"
| đáp
| 'to reply'
| 
| →
| 
|-
| mát
| 'cool'
| 
| →
| 
|-
| khác
| 'different'
| 
| →
| 
|}

When the velar consonants  are after , they are articulated with a simultaneous bilabial closure  (i.e. doubly articulated) or are strongly labialized .

{| cellpadding="5" style="line-height: 1.0em;"
| đục
| 'murky'
| 
| →
| , 
|-
| độc
| 'poison'
| 
| →
| , 
|-
| đọc
| 'to read'
| 
| →
| , 
|-
| ung
| 'cancer'
| 
| →
| , 
|-
| ông
| 'man'/'grandfather'
| 
| →
| , 
|-
| ong
| 'bee'
| 
| →
| , 
|}

Hanoi finals

Analysis of final ch, nh

The pronunciation of syllable-final ch and nh in Hanoi Vietnamese has had different analyses. One analysis, that of  has them as being phonemes , where  contrasts with both syllable-final t  and c  and  contrasts with syllable-final n  and ng . Final  is, then, identified with syllable-initial .

This analysis interprets orthographic ⟨ach⟩ and ⟨anh⟩ as an underlying , which becomes phonetically open and diphthongized:  → ,  → . This diphthongization also affects ⟨êch⟩ and ⟨ênh⟩:  → ,  → .

The first analysis closely follows the surface pronunciation of a slightly different Hanoi dialect than the second. This results in a three-way contrast between the rimes ăn  vs. anh  vs. ăng . For this reason, a separate phonemic  is posited.

Table of Hanoi finals

{| cellpadding="5" style="line-height: 1.0em;"
| ong, oc
| , 
| →
| , 
|-
| ông, ôc
| , 
| →
| , 
|-
| ung, uc
| , 
| →
| , 
|-
| ưng, ưc, ưn, ưt
| →
|-
| anh, ach
| , 
| →
| , 
|-
| ênh, êch
| , 
| →
| , 
|-
| inh, ich
| , 
| →
| , 
|}

Ho Chi Minh City finals

Merger of finals
While the variety of Vietnamese spoken in Hanoi has retained finals faithfully from Middle Vietnamese, the variety spoken in Ho Chi Minh City has drastically changed its finals. However, they are always pronounced  after the other vowels . Subsequently, vowels of rimes ending in labiovelars have been diphthongized, while vowels of rimes ending in alveolar have been centralized.

Table of Ho Chi Minh City finals
The short back vowels in the rimes have been diphthongized and centralized, meanwhile, the consonants have been labialized. Similarly, the short front vowels have been centralized which are realized as central vowels  and the "unspecified" consonants have been affected by coronal spreading from the preceding front vowels which are surfaced as coronals (alveolar) .

{| cellpadding="5" style="line-height: 1.0em;"
|ung, uc
|, 
|→
|, 
|-
| ông, ôc
| , 
| →
| rowspan="2" |, 
|-
|ong, oc
|, 
| →
|-
| anh, ach
|, 
| →
| , 
|-
| ênh, êch
|, 
| →
| , 
|-
| in ~ inh, it ~ ich
|, 
| →
| , 
|-
| um, up
|/um/, /up/
| →
| , 
|-
| ưng ~ ưn, ưc ~ ưt
| , 
| →
| , 
|}

The other closed dialects (Hue, Quang Nam, Binh Dinh) which have also been merged in codas, but some vowels are pronounced differently in some dialects:

The oong, ooc and eng, ec rimes are few and are mostly loanwords or onomatopoeia. The ôông, ôôc (oong, ooc, eng, ec, êng, êc as well) rimes are the "archaic" form before become ông, ôc by diphthongization and still exist in North Central dialect in many placenames.

{| cellpadding="5" style="line-height: 1.0em;"

|on, ot
| , 
|→
| rowspan="2" |, 
|-
|oong, ooc
| , 
| →
|-
|ôn, ôt
| , 
| →
| rowspan="2" |, .
|-
|ôông, ôôc
| , 
| →
|-
|ong,  oc
|, 
|→
| rowspan="2" |, 
|-
|ông, ôc
|, 
|→
|}

Tone
Vietnamese vowels are all pronounced with an inherent tone. Tones differ in

 pitch
 length
 contour melody
 intensity
 phonation (with or without accompanying constricted vocal cords)

Unlike many Native American, African, and Chinese languages, Vietnamese tones do not rely solely on pitch contour. Vietnamese often uses instead a register complex (which is a combination of phonation type, pitch, length, vowel quality, etc.). So perhaps a better description would be that Vietnamese is a register language and not a "pure" tonal language.

In Vietnamese orthography, tone is indicated by diacritics written above or below the vowel.

Six-tone analysis

There is much variation among speakers concerning how tone is realized phonetically. There are differences between varieties of Vietnamese spoken in the major geographic areas (northern, central, southern) and smaller differences within the major areas (e.g. Hanoi vs. other northern varieties). In addition, there seems to be variation among individuals. More research is needed to determine the remaining details of tone realization and the variation among speakers.

Northern varieties

The six tones in the Hanoi and other northern varieties are:

{| class="wikitable" style="text-align: center;"
! Tone name
! Tone ID
! Vni/telex/Viqr
! Description
! Chao Tone Contour
! Diacritic
! Example
|-
| ngang "flat"
| A1
| [default]
| mid level
|  (33)
| style="text-align: center;" |◌
| ba ('three')
|-
| huyền "deep"
| A2
| 2 / f / `
| low falling (breathy)
|  (21) or (31)
| style="text-align: center;" |◌̀
| bà ('grandmother')
|-
| sắc "sharp"
| B1
| 1 / s / '
| mid rising, tense
|  (35)
| style="text-align: center;" |◌́
| bá ('to embrace')
|-
| nặng "heavy"
| B2
| 5 / j / .
| mid falling, glottalized, heavy
| style="text-align: center;" |़
| bạ ('to strengthen')
|-
| hỏi "asking"
| C1
| 3 / r / ?
| mid falling(-rising), emphasis
|  (313) or (323) or (31)
| style="text-align: center;" | ◌̉
| bả ('bait')
|-
| ngã "tumbling"
| C2
| 4 / x / ~
| mid rising, glottalized
|  (3ˀ5) or (4ˀ5)
| style="text-align: center;" |◌̃
| bã ('residue')
|}

Ngang tone:

The ngang tone is level at around the mid level (33) and is produced with modal voice phonation (i.e. with "normal" phonation). Alexandre de Rhodes (1651) describes this as "level";  describes it as "high (or mid) level".

Huyền tone:

The huyền tone starts low-mid and falls (21). Some Hanoi speakers start at a somewhat higher point (31). It is sometimes accompanied by breathy voice (or lax) phonation in some speakers, but this is lacking in other speakers: bà = . Alexandre de Rhodes (1651) describes this as "grave-lowering";  describes it as "low falling".

Hỏi tone:

 The hỏi tone starts a mid level and falls. It starts with modal voice phonation, which moves increasingly toward tense voice with accompanying harsh voice (although the harsh voice seems to vary according to speaker). In Hanoi, the tone is mid falling (31). In other northern speakers, the tone is mid falling and then rises back to the mid level (313 or 323). This characteristic gives this tone its traditional description as "dipping". However, the falling-rising contour is most obvious in citation forms or when syllable-final; in other positions and when in fast speech, the rising contour is negligible. The hỏi also is relatively short compared with the other tones, but not as short as the nặng tone. Alexandre de Rhodes (1651) describes this as "smooth-rising";  describes it as "dipping-rising".

Ngã tone:

 The ngã tone is mid rising (35). Many speakers begin the vowel with modal voice, followed by strong creaky voice starting toward the middle of the vowel, which is then lessening as the end of the syllable is approached. Some speakers with more dramatic glottalization have a glottal stop closure in the middle of the vowel (i.e. as ). In Hanoi Vietnamese, the tone starts at a higher pitch (45) than other northern speakers. Alexandre de Rhodes (1651) describes this as "chesty-raised";  describes it as "creaking-rising".

Sắc tone:

The sắc tone starts as mid and then rises (35) in much the same way as the ngã tone. It is accompanied by tense voice phonation throughout the duration of the vowel. In some Hanoi speakers, the ngã tone is noticeably higher than the sắc tone, for example: sắc =  (34); ngã =  (45). Alexandre de Rhodes (1651) describes this as "acute-angry";  describes it as "high (or mid) rising".

Nặng tone:

 The nặng tone starts mid or low-mid and rapidly falls in pitch (32 or 21). It starts with tense voice that becomes increasingly tense until the vowel ends in a glottal stop closure. This tone is noticeably shorter than the other tones. Alexandre de Rhodes (1651) describes this as "chesty-heavy";  describes it as "constricted".

Southern varieties

In Southern varieties, tones ngang, sắc, huyền have similar contours to Northern tones; however, these tones are produced with normal voice instead of breathy voice.

The nặng tone is pronounced as low rising tone (12) [˩˨] in fast speech or low falling-rising tone (212) [˨˩˨] in more careful utterance.

The ngã and hỏi tone are merged into a mid falling-rising (214) [˨˩˦] which is somewhat similar hỏi tone of non-Hanoi Northern accent mentioned above.

North-central and Central varieties

North-central and Central Vietnamese varieties are fairly similar with respect to tone although within the North-central dialect region there is considerable internal variation.

It is sometimes said (by people from other provinces) that people from Nghệ An pronounce every tone as a nặng tone.

Eight-tone analysis

An older analysis assumes eight tones rather than six. This follows the lead of traditional Chinese phonology. Rather, they were consistently pronounced with a short high tone, which was called the entering tone and considered a fourth tone. These are not phonemically distinct from the sắc and nặng tones, however, and hence not considered as separate tones by modern linguists and are not distinguished in the orthography.

Syllables and phonotactics
A description of syllable structure and exploration of its patterning according to the Prosodic Analysis approach of J.R. Firth is given in Henderson (1966).

The Vietnamese syllable structure follows the scheme:

(C1)(w)V(G|C2)+T

where
{| cellpadding="7" cellspacing="0" style="background: #f9f9f9;"
| style="vertical-align: top;" |
 C1 = initial consonant onset
 w = labiovelar on-glide 
 V = vowel nucleus
| style="vertical-align: top;" |
 G = off-glide coda ( or )
 C2 = final consonant coda
 T = tone.
|}

In other words, a syllable has an obligatory nucleus and tone, and can have an optional consonant onset, an optional on-glide , and an optional coda or off-glide.

More explicitly, the syllable types are as follows:

{| class="wikitable"
|- style="font-size: 85%; background: #f2f2f2;"
! Syllable
! Example
! Syllable
! Example
|-
| V
| ê "eh"
| wV
| uể "sluggish"
|-
| VC
| ám "possess (by ghosts,.etc)"
| wVC
| oán "bear a grudge"
|-
| VC
| ớt "capsicum"
| wVC
| oắt "little imp"
|-
| CV
| nữ "female"
| CwV
| huỷ "cancel"
|-
| CVC
| cơm "rice"
| CwVC
| toán "math"
|-
| CVC
| tức "angry"
| CwVC
| hoặc "or"
|}

C1: Any consonant may occur in as an onset with the following exceptions:
  does not occur in native Vietnamese words

w: the onglide  (sometimes transcribed instead as labialization  on a preceding consonant):

 does not occur after labial consonants 
 does not occur after  in native Vietnamese words (it occurs in uncommon Sino-Vietnamese borrowings)

V: The vowel nucleus V may be any of the following 14 monophthongs or diphthongs: .

Together, V and G must form one of the diphthongs or triphthongs listed in the section on Vowels.
 offglide  does not follow the front vowels 
 offglide  does not follow the rounded vowels 
 with some exceptions (such as khuỷu tay "elbow"), the offglide  cannot occur if the syllable contains a  onglide

C2: The optional coda C2 is restricted to labial, coronal, and velar stops and nasals , which cannot cooccur with the offglides .

T: Syllables are spoken with an inherent tone contour:
 Six tone contours are possible for syllables with offglides , closed syllables with nasal codas , and open syllables—i.e., those without consonant codas .
 If the syllable is closed with one of the oral stops , only two contours are possible: the sắc and the nặng tones.

 Less common rimes may not be represented in this table.
 The nặng tone mark (dot below) has been added to all rimes in this table for illustration purposes only. It indicates which letter tone marks in general are added to, largely according to the "new style" rules of Vietnamese orthography as stated in Quy tắc đặt dấu thanh trong chữ quốc ngữ. In practice, not all these rimes have real words or syllables that have the nặng tone.
 The IPA representations are based on Wikipedia's conventions. Different dialects may have different pronunciations.

Notes
Below is a table comparing four linguists' different transcriptions of Vietnamese vowels as well as the orthographic representation. Notice that this article mostly follows , with the exception of marking short vowels short.

{| class="wikitable"
|+ comparison of orthography & vowel descriptions
|- style="text-align: center;"
! Orthography
! Wikipedia
! Thompson
! Han
! Nguyễn
! Đoàn
|- style="text-align: center;"
| i/y
| 
| 
| 
| 
| 
|- style="text-align: center;"
| ê
| 
| 
| 
| 
| 
|- style="text-align: center;"
| e
| 
| 
| 
| 
| 
|- style="text-align: center;"
| ư
| 
| 
| 
| 
| 
|- style="text-align: center;"
| u
| 
| 
| 
| 
| 
|- style="text-align: center;"
| ô
| 
| 
| 
| 
| 
|- style="text-align: center;"
| o
| 
| 
| 
| 
| 
|- style="text-align: center;"
| ơ
| 
| 
| 
| 
| 
|- style="text-align: center;"
| â
| 
| 
| 
| 
| 
|- style="text-align: center;"
| a
| 
| 
| 
| 
| 
|- style="text-align: center;"
| ă
| 
| 
| 
| 
| 
|}

His vowels above are only the basic vowel phonemes. Thompson gives a very detailed description of each vowel's various allophonic realizations.

 uses acoustic analysis, including spectrograms and formant measuring and plotting, to describe the vowels. She states that the primary difference between orthographic ơ & â and a & ă is a difference of length (a ratio of 2:1).  ơ = , â = ; a = , ă = .

Another thing to mention about Han's studies is that she uses a rather small number of participants and, additionally, although her participants are native speakers of the Hanoi variety, they all have lived outside of Hanoi for a significant period of their lives (e.g. in France or Ho Chi Minh City).

 has a simpler, more symmetrical description. He says that his work is not a "complete grammar" but rather a "descriptive introduction."  So, his chart above is more a phonological vowel chart rather than a phonetic one.

References

Bibliography

Alves, Mark J. 2007. "A Look At North-Central Vietnamese." In SEALS XII Papers from the 12th Annual Meeting of the Southeast Asian Linguistics Society 2002, edited by Ratree Wayland et al.. Canberra, Australia, 1–7. Pacific Linguistics, Research School of Pacific and Asian Studies, The Australian National University. 
 
 
 
 Đoàn, Thiện Thuật; Nguyễn, Khánh Hà, Phạm, Như Quỳnh. (2003). A Concise Vietnamese Grammar (For Non-Native Speakers). Hà Nội: Thế Giới Publishers, 2001.
 Earle, M. A. (1975). An acoustic study of northern Vietnamese tones. Santa Barbara: Speech Communications Research Laboratory, Inc.
 
 Ferlus, Michel. (1997). Problemes de la formation du systeme vocalique du vietnamien. Asie Orientale, 26 (1), .
 Gregerson, Kenneth J. (1969). A study of Middle Vietnamese phonology. Bulletin de la Société des Etudes Indochinoises, 44, 135–193. (Published version of the author's MA thesis, University of Washington). (Reprinted 1981, Dallas: Summer Institute of Linguistics).
 
 Han, Mieko S.  (1968).  Complex syllable nuclei in Vietnamese. Studies in the phonology of Asian languages (Vol. 6); U.S. Office of Naval Research. Los Angeles: University of Southern California.
 Han, Mieko S.  (1969).  Vietnamese tones. Studies in the phonology of Asian languages (Vol. 8). Los Angeles: Acoustic Phonetics Research Laboratory, University of Southern California.
 Han, Mieko S.; & Kim, Kong-On.  (1972).  Intertonal influences in two-syllable utterances of Vietnamese. Studies in the phonology of Asian languages (Vol. 10). Los Angeles: Acoustic Phonetics Research Laboratory, University of Southern California.
 

 
 
 
 Henderson, Eugénie J. A. 1966. Towards a prosodic statement of the Vietnamese syllable structure. In In Memory of J. R. Firth, ed. by C. J. Bazell et al., (pp. 163–197). London: Longmans.
 Hoàng, Thị Châu. (1989). Tiếng Việt trên các miền đất nước: Phương ngữ học. Hà Nội: Khoa học xã hội.
 
 
 
 
 
 
 Nguyễn, Đình-Hoà.  (1955).  Quốc-ngữ: The modern writing system in Vietnam. Washington, D. C.
 Nguyễn, Đình-Hoà.  (1959).  Hòa's Vietnamese-English dictionary. Saigon. (Revised as Nguyễn 1966 & 1995).
 Nguyễn, Đình-Hoà.  (1966).  Vietnamese-English dictionary. Rutland, VT: C.E. Tuttle Co. (Revised version of Nguyễn 1959).
 
 Nguyễn, Đình-Hoà.  (1995).  NTC's Vietnamese-English dictionary (rev. ed.). Lincolnwood, IL.: NTC Pub. Group. (Revised & expanded version of Nguyễn 1966).
 Nguyễn, Đình-Hoà.  (1996). Vietnamese. In P. T. Daniels, & W. Bright (Eds.), The world's writing systems, (pp. 691–699). New York: Oxford University Press. .
 
 
 Phạm, Hoà. (2001). A phonetic study of Vietnamese tones: Reconsideration of the register flip-flop rule in reduplication. In C. Féry, A. D. Green, & R. van de Vijver (Eds.), Proceedings of HILP5 (pp. 140–158). Linguistics in Potsdam (No. 12). Potsdam: Universität Potsdam (5th conference of the Holland Institute of Linguistics-Phonology). .

External links
Ngữ âm học

Phonologies by language
Vietnamese language